Kirks Mills Historic District is a national historic district located at Little Britain Township, Lancaster County, Pennsylvania. The district includes 12 contributing buildings in the village of Kirks Mills.  They are Jacob Kirk's Mansion House (c. 1752), Brick Mill / Kirk's Mill (c. 1810), the brick miller's house, stone and log barn converted to a residence in 1975, Joseph Reynold's House (1825), Eastland Friend's Meeting and Tenant House (c. 1798, 1822), Ephriam B. Lynch House (1880s), Harry Reynolds House (c. 1774), Manuel Reynolds House, Eastland School House (1838), and Log House.  The Jacob Kirk's Mansion House is a three-story, brick dwelling with a two-story ell.  It features a full porch on the front and right sides.  Kirk's Mill is a -story brick building with a slate gable roof. It was remodeled to a residence about 1940.

It was listed on the National Register of Historic Places in 1978.

References

Historic districts on the National Register of Historic Places in Pennsylvania
Historic districts in Lancaster County, Pennsylvania
National Register of Historic Places in Lancaster County, Pennsylvania